Bariša Čolak (born 1 January 1956) is Bosnian Croat politician and lawyer who was a member of the national House of Peoples from 2015 to 2023. He previously served as Minister of Justice from 2007 to 2015.

Čolak was also Minister of Security from 2002 to 2007. He is a member and former president of the Croatian Democratic Union.

Early life and education
Čolak was born on 1 January 1956 in Široki Brijeg, where he attended elementary and high school. He graduated from the Faculty of Law of University Džemal Bijedić of Mostar in 1979. He also attended postgraduate studies on subject Bosnia and Herzegovina and European Law, but because of his duties as a minister, study was on halt.

Early career
From 1979 to 1988, with a break from April 1980 to April 1981, Čolak worked as director of the constructional hardware "Metalac Lištica" which was part of the SOKO company in Mostar. From 1988 to the end of 1993, he worked as a judge in Lištica, renamed Široki Brijeg.

Political career
Čolak joined the Croatian Democratic Union (HDZ BiH) in 1993. After that, until 1996, he was assistant of the Minister of Justice, Deputy Minister of Justice and later Minister of Justice of the Croatian Republic of Herzeg-Bosnia. After the war, from 27 March 1996 until September 1999, he was the first Prime Minister of West Herzegovina Canton.

Čolak was a member of the party's Municipal Board in Široki Brijeg and later member of the Cantonal Board of the West Herzegovina Canton and member of the Central Committee of the party. He was also repeatedly a member of the party's presidency.

In 1999, Čolak became the Federal Minister of Justice. At the 2000 parliamentary election, Čolak won 5,412 votes for a seat in the Federal Parliament, but he continued to be a minister in the Federal Government. From 2001 until 2002, Čolak was acting president of the HDZ BiH, and in March 2002 he left the Federal Ministry of Justice and dedicated himself to the party's activity since he had become president of the HDZ BiH.

At the 2002 general election, Čolak won 16,721 votes and entered the Federal Parliament once again. He remained the party's president until 2005. In January 2003, he became the national Minister of Security and held that duty until 2007. On 11 January 2007, Čolak was named national Minister of Justice, serving until 31 March 2015. Following the 2014 general election, in March 2015, he was appointed member of the national House of Peoples. He served as member of the House of Peoples until February 2023.

Personal life
Bariša is married to Anela Čolak; the couple has three children.

References

External links

House of Peoples, Parliament BiH - Bariša Čolak. Parliament BiH 

1956 births
Living people
People from Široki Brijeg
Croats of Bosnia and Herzegovina
Croatian Democratic Union of Bosnia and Herzegovina politicians
Government ministers of Bosnia and Herzegovina
Security ministers of Bosnia and Herzegovina
Members of the House of Peoples of Bosnia and Herzegovina